is a Japanese professional cosplayer, model, actress, and licensed practical nurse. She is represented by 01familia and is an exclusive model for the women's fashion magazine Bis. She is best known for portraying the villain Yodonna in Mashin Sentai Kiramager (2020).

Originally a nurse, Momotsuki was scouted by her agency in 2017 and entered the entertainment industry as a gravure model, attracting attention due to her day job. She was appointed an exclusive model for Bis in October 2019 and released her own photo books in 2020 and 2022. As an actress, she first appeared in a television drama in 2019 and appeared in Mashin Sentai Kiramager the year after, followed by appearances in several films in the franchise, as well as Garo: Versus Road (2020) and Short Program (2022). She is also a regular performer on the Zeroichi TV YouTube channel and has made her voice acting debut in Love After World Domination (2022).

Biography 
Momotsuki was born and raised in Toyohashi, Aichi Prefecture. After graduating from high school, Momotsuki started working as a nurse assistant at a hospital in her hometown after she learned that it would allow her to attend nursing school while working to pay the tuition. She became a nurse in 2016, and after her entertainment debut, she left Toyohashi and started working at a clinic in Tokyo. As of 2020, she was still active as a nurse.

Momotsuki started cosplaying in her third year of high school at a local cosplay event. Her stage name was taken from the mascot Funassyi and the webcomic character Shinya Momotsuki. As her job offers increased, she moved to Tokyo to further develop her entertainment career and attended various classes related to acting and modelling, as well as English and Chinese language lessons.

Momotsuki made her first television appearance on the talk show  on MBS in February 2018. She appeared at the 2018 Nurse Fes Tokyo as a moderator for the "Nurse Plus One" event, which introduced nurses who were also active in other fields like herself. She also served as a judge for the DC Comics cosplay contest at Tokyo Comic-Con 2018 and made her commercial debut for the mobile game . She made her television drama debut on episode 4 of 10-jin Spy Daisakusen: Code Balikata, aired on Television Saitama and affiliated stations in February 2019.

In October, Momotsuki was selected as a regular model for the women's fashion magazine Bis. She had previously been featured in the June edition, and mentioned that being a regular magazine model had been one of her "major goals".

On September 25, 2020, Momotsuki made her first appearance as whip-wielding supporting antagonist Yodonna on episode 25 of Mashin Sentai Kiramager. The character was well-received, being given such nicknames as "The Exceedingly Beautiful Enemy Officer", and in 2021 she became the protagonist of two spin-off web films set after the events of the main series, Yodonna and Yodonna 2. The films were released on the Toei Tokusatsu Fan Club (TTFC) service and are the first spin-off media starring a villain character in the Super Sentai franchise.

On November 11, 2020, Momotsuki released her first photo book, titled  and published by Kodansha. Photography for the book took place on Ishigaki Island, Okinawa, and the title was both meant as an expression of her "immaturity" and a homophone of "tangerine" (mikan), inspired by the words  and "pear" (nashi) in her name. It was reprinted three times and sold over 10,000 copies within 2 months after release.

Momotsuki is a regular on 01familia's YouTube channel Zeroichi TV and is the host for the agency's first terrestrial monthly variety show,  on MBS TV, both of which started in October 2021.

On March 30, 2022, Momotsuki released her second photo book with the English title Peachy, a reference to both her name and the actual English word. The book sold about 2000 copies in its first week. That month, she also served as an ambassador for DC Comics' "The Dawn of Superheroes" travelling exhibition and threw out a ceremonial first pitch for a baseball game at Vantelin Dome Nagoya in cosplay as Supergirl.

Personal life 
Momotsuki's interests include cosplay, manga, games, piano, and following Japanese idol groups. She is left-handed, but uses her right hand when writing and using knives.

Appearances

Television series

Feature film

Web series

Web film

Theater

Cosplay events

References 

Living people
1995 births
Models from Aichi Prefecture
21st-century Japanese actresses
Cosplayers
Japanese nurses